Richard Joseph Welch (February 13, 1869 – September 10, 1949) was an American county clerk and politician. He sat in the United States House of Representatives for 12 terms from 1926 to 1949, serving a district in San Francisco, California. Before this, Welch had been a state senator. As of 2022, he is the last Republican to represent San Francisco in the House.

Biography 
Born in Monroe County, New York, Welch was educated in the public schools.  He moved to California in early boyhood and settled in San Francisco.  He worked on a farm in Freeport, and then was apprenticed as an ironworker, which led to his becoming trained as a machinist.  He later served as clerk of the San Francisco County Superior Court.  Welch became active in politics as a Republican, including serving as treasurer of his local Republican Club, helping organize campaign events for the ticket of William McKinley and Garret A. Hobart during the 1896 presidential campaign, and organizing San Francisco's Dewey Republican Club in 1898.  He served in the California Senate from 1901 to 1913.

Welch was the harbormaster for the port of San Francisco from 1903 to 1907.  He served on the San Francisco Board of Supervisors from 1916 until September 30, 1926, when he resigned, having been elected to Congress.

Congress 
Welch was elected to the Sixty-ninth Congress to fill the vacancy caused by the death of Lawrence J. Flaherty.  He was re-elected to the Seventieth and to the eleven succeeding Congresses and served from August 31, 1926, until his death in a hospital in Needles, California, September 10, 1949. He was succeeded by John F. Shelley and was the last Republican to hold this seat.

He served as chairman of the Committee on Labor (Seventy-first Congress), and the Committee on Public Lands (Eightieth Congress).

He was interred at Holy Cross Cemetery in Colma, California.

See also 
 List of United States Congress members who died in office (1900–49)

External links 

Join California Richard J. Welch

1869 births
1949 deaths
Burials at Holy Cross Cemetery (Colma, California)
Republican Party members of the United States House of Representatives from California
Republican Party California state senators
20th-century American politicians